The Bespoke Overcoat is a 1956 British black and white short film directed by Jack Clayton, based on a 1953 play of the same name by Wolf Mankowitz. The story is an adaptation of Nikolai Gogol's short story The Overcoat with the action moved from Russia to the East End of London. In this version the protagonists are poor Jews working in the clothing trade, played by Alfie Bass and David Kossoff. It won an Oscar at the 29th Academy Awards in 1957 for Best Short Subject (Two-Reel).

Plot
The film titles run as a funeral takes place. A coffin is placed in the grave. We then see an overcoat being thrown on the coffin, before the grave is infilled. Morrie a Jewish tailor, speaks to himself in the mirror. He is then joined by the dead Fender. They debate the art of tailoring.

Fender is a lowly clerk in the warehouse of clothing manufacturers Ranting and Co. He complains to his boss, Mr Ranting that it is cold, and he wishes he had a good coat. Ranting ridicules him and says he will never be able to afford £20 for a good coat. He goes to  a tailor friend, Morrie, to make a bespoke overcoat. They discuss the materials and the cost, which is agreed at £10.

As the coat progresses he goes for a fitting. The coat has no arms, and looks very big, but he says it is too tight under the arms. They agree that Fender will pay £2 at this stage. Ranting fires Fender. He goes to Morrie. They drink brandy by candlelight and Fender cries as he says he must cancel the order. Morrie says he will finish the coat nevertheless.

Fender lies in bed and regrets not fighting for his job, or fighting for a sheepskin coat. He coughs and coughs. He dies in his sleep. His ghost speaks to Morrie, who gives him the completed coat. However he still wants a sheepskin coat from Ranting's warehouse. The pair drink more brandy and go to the warehouse. Morrie asks if he can walk through the wall but Fender wishes to use the door.

They enter and find a rail of jackets. They agree Morrie's work is better but "Ranting owes me" he says. Fender wishes Morrie a long life and says "pray for me", as he slowly walks away into eternity. Back at his house, Morrie puts on a black skullcap and says a Jewish prayer.

Cast
 Alfie Bass as Fender (Ghost)
 David Kossoff as Morrie
 Alan Tilvern as Ranting
 Alf Dean as Gravedigger (uncredited)

Reception
Pauline Kael called The Bespoke Overcoat "one of the best short-story films ever made".

Stage play
The play was performed at the Arts Theatre in London with Kossoff and Bass and was directed by Alec Clunes.  The supporting cast was Harold Kasket and Oscar Quitak.

References

External links

1956 films
1956 short films
1956 drama films
1950s ghost films
British black-and-white films
British ghost films
British drama short films
Films about Jews and Judaism
Films about poverty
Films based on The Overcoat
Films directed by Jack Clayton
Films set in London
Live Action Short Film Academy Award winners
Films with screenplays by Wolf Mankowitz
1950s English-language films
1950s British films